{{Infobox cricket team
|           name = Saint Vincent and the Grenadines
|          image = 
|        captain = 
|        founded = First recorded match: 2000
|      dissolved = 2016
|         ground = Arnos Vale Playing Field, Arnos Vale
|         title1 = S50
|     title1wins = 1
|         title2 = T20 Blaze
|     title2wins = 0
}}
The Saint Vincent and the Grenadines women's cricket team is the women's representative cricket team of the country of Saint Vincent and the Grenadines. They competed in the West Indies women's domestic cricket structure between 2000 and 2014, after which they were replaced by the Windward Islands.

History
Saint Vincent and the Grenadines joined the West Indies domestic structure in 2000, playing in the Federation Championships. The results of this season are not recorded. In 2002 they reached the semi-finals of the knockout section of the Championships before winning their first title in 2004, topping the league section of the tournament with 5 wins from 6 games.

The following season, 2005, St Vincent were runners-up in both sections of the competition, losing out to Trinidad and Tobago both times. St Vincent continued competing in the tournament until 2014, and finished runners-up again in 2010, again losing in the final to Trinidad and Tobago. The side also competed in the first two seasons of the Twenty20 Blaze in 2012 and 2013, both times finishing 5th in the tournament.

After 2014 St Vincent no longer competed in the domestic structure, with North Windward Islands and South Windward Islands competing in 2015 and a unified Windward Islands team, including Saint Vincent and the Grenadines, competing from 2016 onwards. The side did compete in three friendlies against Grenada in 2016, but the results are unrecorded.

Players
Notable players
Players who played for Saint Vincent and the Grenadines and played internationally are listed below, in order of first international appearance (given in brackets):

 Juliana Nero (2003)
 Genielle Greaves (2003)
 Clea Hoyte (2003)
 Cordel Jack (2005)

Honours
 Women's Super50 Cup:
 Winners (1): 2004 (League)
 Twenty20 Blaze:
 Winners (0):
 Best finish:'' 5th (2012 & 2013)

See also
 Windward Islands women's cricket team
 Saint Vincent and the Grenadines national cricket team

References

Women's national cricket teams
Women's cricket in Saint Vincent and the Grenadines
Women's cricket teams in the West Indies